Dolac is a village in the municipality of Bela Palanka, Serbia. According to the 2011 census, the village has a population of  435 people.

Notable people
Rajko Mitić, football player

References

Populated places in Pirot District